Stafford is a town in the Borough of Stafford, Staffordshire, England.  The unparished area contains 141 buildings that are recorded in the National Heritage List for England as designated listed buildings. Of these, one is listed at Grade I, the highest grade, 15 are listed at Grade II*, the middle of the three grades, and the others are at Grade II, the lowest grade. This list contains the listed buildings in the outer area of the town, including the suburb of  Baswich; those in the central area are in Listed buildings in Stafford (Central Area).

The listed buildings in this area include churches with memorials in the churchyards and other related structures, houses and associated structures, buildings forming part of HM Prison Stafford, a former windmill, a road bridge, a former public house, the remains of Stafford Castle, a former hospital, schools, a former library, a boundary post, war memorials, and three bridges over the Staffordshire and Worcestershire Canal.


Key

Buildings

References

Citations

Sources

Lists of listed buildings in Staffordshire